The Garfield County Courthouse is a historic courthouse building located in Enid, Oklahoma.  It is on the National Register of Historic Places both individually and as a part of the Enid Downtown Historic District.

Previous courthouses (1896 - 1936)

Enid's first courthouse opened on April 1, 1896. It consisted of a two-story brick building, which the County soon outgrew. Enid's second courthouse was built by O.A. Campbell of Oklahoma City in 1907 from Oklahoma granite and Indiana stone. The building was located in the center of Broadway, surrounded by sidewalks, and fully landscaped. Its south side was located where the front of the Enid Post Office is now. (Enid's post office used to be where the public library is located now, and Enid's public library was a Carnegie building located at 402 North Independence.) On January 29, 1931, a fire broke out in the jail and spread to the roof, then quickly spread to the rest of the building. All prisoners were safely evacuated, and county records were rescued. From 1931 to 1936, the County operated out of an agricultural building, and later the Broadway Tower.

Current courthouse

The current Art Deco style Courthouse was built by Hawk & Parr and Reinhart & Donovan companies beginning on August 15, 1934, and was completed in 1936. The jail was refurbished in the 1960s. Garfield County Courthouse consists of county offices and courtrooms housed in the basement and first three floors, and Garfield County Jail occupies the top two floors. Funded by the Works Progress Administration Federal Art Project, artist Ruth Augur painted historical murals on the courthouse walls. In 1996, Enid artists Paladine Roye and his brother, Burgess Roye, also painted murals relating to Native American history.

Gallery

References

Courthouses on the National Register of Historic Places in Oklahoma
Buildings and structures in Enid, Oklahoma
County courthouses in Oklahoma
Government buildings completed in 1936
Art Deco architecture in Oklahoma
Works Progress Administration in Oklahoma
National Register of Historic Places in Garfield County, Oklahoma